Youngsan University of Seonstudies is a private religious university located in Yeonggwang County, South Jeolla province, South Korea.  It offers graduate and undergraduate training in Won Buddhism and related matters.

History
The predecessor of the university was founded on April 1, 1927, as Youngsan Hagwon (영산학원/靈山學院), a private academy for training Won Buddhist clergy.  It closed down for three years at the end of World War II, from 1944 to 1947, and again during the Korean War from 1950 to 1952.  It closed down once again in 1957, to be reopened as a religious school recognized by the government in 1964.  1964 is thus recognized by some as the date of the school's actual founding. The school became a college in 1986, and a university in 1997.

See also
List of colleges and universities in South Korea
Education in South Korea

External links
Official school website, in Korean

Religious organizations based in South Korea
Universities and colleges in South Jeolla Province
Buddhist universities and colleges in South Korea
1927 establishments in Korea
Educational institutions established in 1927